NFL on CBS music consists of theme songs and tunes employed by the CBS television network during broadcasts of National Football League games. These events are branded as the NFL on CBS.

1960s
In the '60s and early '70s, CBS used a marching band-like composition called "Confidence" (taken from Leon Carr's score from the 1964 off-Broadway musical The Secret Life of Walter Mitty) as their theme.

1970s
By 1975 NFL season, CBS had several themes (technically, CBS had different opening songs and graphics per crew) to open their broadcasts. They ranged from David Shire's "Manhattan Skyline" from the Saturday Night Fever soundtrack to "Fly, Robin, Fly" by the Silver Convention; the main title theme was usually "Horizontal Hold" by Jan Stoeckart.

From roughly, 1977–1979, CBS used the disco-style version of John Williams' main theme from Star Wars Theme/Cantina Band.

1980s
Starting in 1980, CBS frequently used the beginning guitar riff of Heart's "Crazy on You" when they went to commercial.

In 1981 NFL season, CBS changed the game opening music and kept it through the 1985 NFL season. The 1981–1985 NFL on CBS theme was a peppy, fanfare-styled theme. The patriotic-like opening graphic showed the flag of the United States morphing into the words "National Football League."

For their Super Bowl XVI coverage at the end of the 1981 season, CBS' theme music eventually became the theme for CBS Sports Spectacular. The music itself, could be considered a hybrid of the then NFL Today theme and their original college basketball theme.

Beginning in 1986 NFL season, CBS adapted a theme that has affectionately been referred to as the "Pots and Pans" (because of the background notes often resembled the banging of pots and pans) theme. This particular theme was an intense, kinetic, synthesizer-laced theme. In 1989 NFL season, the '"Pots and Pans'" theme was revamped to give it a more smooth, electronic music style. This theme was also known for integrating the play-by-play announcer's voice-over introduction into the theme, it integrated three voice-over segments, one for the visiting team, home team, and game storyline to set the game storyline into the broadcast. This practice was common with CBS Sports themes of the 1980s.

For CBS' coverage of Super Bowl XXI at the end of the 1986 season, CBS featured an intensely bombastic, highly energetic and catchy theme. This theme (composed by Lloyd Landesman) ultimately became the theme used for SEC on CBS (which was also the case for the theme CBS used from 1984 NCAA Division I-A football season-1986 NCAA Division I-A football season after debuting it for Super Bowl XVIII) for the 1987 NCAA Division I-A football season (this theme was actually loosely based on the "Pots and Pans" theme). The postshow for Super Bowl XXI was supposed to feature the song "One Shining Moment" but due to postgame interviews taking so long, CBS never aired it. They ultimately changed the lyrics from "The ball is kicked" to "The ball is tipped", and now airs it at the end of their NCAA Division I men's basketball tournament coverage.

For CBS' coverage of Super Bowl XXIV at the end of the 1989 season, they introduced a brand new theme. The theme was a considerably more traditional and standard (but still peppy and bombastic), theme than the one of the past four seasons. The theme was used until the 1991 NFC Championship Game.

1990s
For CBS' coverage of Super Bowl XXVI at the end of the 1991 season, CBS once again introduced a brand new theme. Composed by jingle writer Frankie Vinci, the new theme had a bombastic, epic and strikingly catchy hook, with the rest of the composition featuring a jazzy feel with some electric guitar mixed in. CBS used this theme until the end of the 1993 NFL season (when they lost the NFC television package to NFL on Fox). However, NFL on Westwood One Sports continued using the Vinci theme music leading up to CBS' return to the NFL in 1998 NFL season.

When CBS returned to televising the NFL in 1998, they kept the 1992–1993 melody, but rerecorded the theme with updated instrumentation. The 1992 theme lasted seven seasons on television (1992–93, 1998–2002).

2000s
For the 1999–2000 and 2001–2002 seasons respectively, CBS tweaked the now familiar theme music. The 1999–2000 version had heavier sounding notes while the theme used for the 2001–2002 seasons (debuting during CBS' coverage of Super Bowl XXXV) was a more brisk, whimsical and light-hearted sounding composition.

As a precursor to the eventual changeover in music for the 2003 season, CBS used the song "Pompeii", composed by the Los Angeles electronic music group E.S. Posthumus, during the intro of the 2002 AFC Championship Game between the Oakland Raiders and Tennessee Titans. The song used since the beginning of the 2003 NFL season is the E.S. Posthumus composition "Posthumus Zone". For the 2005 NFL season, CBS frequently played a hip hop music-inspired remix of "Posthumus Zone" entitled "Rise to Glory", featuring DJ Quik and Bizarre.

2010s
In 2014, CBS used a different, but very similar, E.S. Posthumus composition for its Thursday games, except for Thanksgiving. All Sunday games, plus the Thanksgiving game, continued to use the 2003 E.S. Posthumus theme. That theme has now been used since 2021 for CBS Sports' soccer broadcasts.

See also
List of sports television composers

References

CBS
CBS Sports
Sports television theme songs